Chris Jeffs (born in 1976), best known by the stage name Cylob, is a British electronic musician and producer closely associated with Aphex Twin. He has produced seven albums, three compilations and a number of remixes. Previously signed to Rephlex records, Jeffs started his own digital label Cylob Industries in 2007. His most well-known tracks include "Rewind" and "Cut The Midrange, Drop The Bass".

Career
His career evolved after he gave a demo tape to Aphex Twin at a gig in early 1993, who subsequently signed Jeffs to his Rephlex label a short time after. For a while the two were working and living in the same building.

Since his debut, he has released 13 singles and 5 albums on Rephlex, in addition to the EP Spider Report for Breakin' Records. Then followed the harsh dancefloor sonics of Cylob's Latest Effort and Lobster Tracks (with its Chris Cunningham-illustrated sleeve), pop pastiche with "Living In The 1980s", meditative bells and gongs on Mood Bells and the electronic funk and braindance of Cylob Music System Volumes 1 & 2.

Although Cylob's music is predominantly instrumental, using a drum machine patch with sequencers, that evolved into a digital compositions which included "midi style sequencing".

A video to "Rewind" directed by Mark Adcock and featuring martial artist Chloe Bruce saw a fair amount of MTV airplay on its release in 1999.

In 2007 he launched his own label, Cylob Industries, to release his material, while licensing it to various labels for hard-copy prints on CD and vinyl. In 2014, the compilation Cymply The Best 93-01 was released, while much of the Rephlex material was re-released. Chris has since retired from the music industry citing tinnitus as the reason he can no longer produce music.

Discography

Singles and EPs 
Kinesthesia Volume 1 as Kinesthesia (Rephlex CAT 011 EP : 12/93)
Kinesthesia Volume 2 as Kinesthesia (Rephlex CAT 014 EP : 7/95)
Industrial Folk Songs (Rephlex CAT 015 EP : 8/95)
Empathy Box Remixes as Kinesthesia (Rephlex CAT 022 EP : 1/96)
Cylob's Latest Effort (Rephlex CAT 049 EP/CD : 97)
Diof 97 (Rephlex CAT 044 EP/CD : 97)
Are We Not Men Who Live and Die (Rephlex CYLOB 1 EP/CD : 98)
Rewind! (Rephlex CAT 074 EP/CD : 2/99)
Lobster Tracks (Rephlex CAT 076 EP/CD : 7/99)
Living in the 1980s / Sex Machine (Rephlex CAT 075 EP / CD : 11/99)
Cut The Midrange, Drop The Bass (Rephlex CAT 121 EP / CD : 11/2001)
Cylobotnia (with Astrobotnia) (Rephlex CAT 144 EP / CD : 10/2003)
Cylob Music System Volume 1 (Rephlex CAT 151 EP : 4 / 2004)
Cylob Music System Volume 2 (Rephlex CAT 152 EP : 5 / 2004)
Spider Report E.P. (Breakin' Records BRK45 : 5 / 2004)
Private Life (With DMX Krew as Private Lives) (SoulJazz Records SJR 160 12 : 7/2007)
Rock The Trojan Fader (Cylob Industries CSR 001 M : 7 / 2007)
Late In The Day (Cylob Industries CSR 005 M : 1 / 2008)
Alpine Acid (mp3 only) (Cylob Industries : 16 / 1 / 2008)
Pepper Spray (Cylob Industries CSR 006 M : 3 / 2010)
Inflatable Hope (Power Vacuum POWVAC012 : 16 / 6 / 2015)
Tomorrow Foolish Logic (Cylob Industries : 10/2021)

Albums 
Empathy Box as Kinesthesia, later re-released as Cylob (Rephlex CAT 022 LP/CD : 4/96)
Loops and Breaks (Rephlex CAT 032 LP : 8/96)
Cylobian Sunset (Rephlex CAT 033 LP/CD : 8/96)
Previously Unavailable on Compact Disc (Rephlex CAT 055 CD : 98)
Mood Bells (Rephlex CAT 122 CD : 11/2001)
Trojan Fader Style (Cylob Industries CSR 002 M : 7/2007)
Formant Potaton (Cylob Industries CSR 003 M : 8/2007)
Ambient News as Ambient News (Cylob Industries CSR 007 M : 8/2009)
Bounds Green (Cylob Industries CSR 004 M & WeMe 012 : 9/2007)
Catastrophic as nonprivate (Alku ALKU 93 : 4/2010)
Zweite Sendung as Ambient News (Cylob Industries CSR 009 : 10/2011)
The Quantum Loonyverse (mp3/flac only) (Cylob Industries CSR 010 : 1 / 1 / 2015)
54 Minute Mirage (Cylob Industries CSR 012 : 8/2020)
One Less Pitch (Cylob Industries CSR 011 : 8/2020)
Live 060708 (Cylob Industries CSR 301 : 8/2020)
PLACEHOLDER (Cylob Industries CSR 013 : 10/2021)

Remixes 
Bochum Welt : Scharlach Eingang : Rephlex CAT 030 EP : "Phlughaven Alphard (Kinesthesia Mix)" : 94
Aphex Twin : Ventolin : Warp WAP 60 R : "Ventolin (Cylob mix)" : 95
Immersion : Remixes Volume 3 : Swim : "Envelope (Cylob remix)" : 95
DMX Krew : Nu Romantix : Rephlex CAT 061 LP/CD : "I'm All Alone (Cylob's mix)" : 98
The Jones Machine : Rephlex CAT 083 EP/CD : "You're The One (Part Two) - Cylob's mix / (I'm The)" * "Disco Dancing - Cylob's mix" : 99
Soulwax : Saturday (Hotline mix) : Play It Again Sam : 99
The Mike Flowers Pops : 1999 : Lo Recordings : 99
Christian Vogel : "Whipaspank (Cylob mix)" : Novamute : 2000
"Synclair (Cylob Mix)" : Areal Records : 2007

References

External links 
 CylobIndustries.com
 ChrisJeffs.com
 

1976 births
Living people
English electronic musicians
English record producers
Intelligent dance musicians
Rephlex Records artists